Per Madsen (born 20 August 1944) is a Danish footballer. He played in three matches for the Denmark national football team from 1969 to 1970.

References

External links
 

1944 births
Living people
Danish men's footballers
Denmark international footballers
Place of birth missing (living people)
Association footballers not categorized by position